Kapil Tiwari is an Indian folk philanthropist. He was awarded Padma Shri for his contribution in folk in 2020.

Early life and education
Tiwari is from Sagar district of Madhya Pradesh.In 1979, he had done doctorate in Hindi Literature from Sagar University and went to Bhopal.

Career
Tiwari was the former director of Adivasi Lokkala Academy and a member of Bharat Bhawan. He had worked for the development of folk and tribal communities. He has edited 39 books associated with the folk culture.

Awards
In 2020, he was awarded the Padma Shri by the Indian Government for his contribution in folk.

References

Year of birth missing (living people)
Living people
People from Sagar district
Recipients of the Padma Shri in other fields